Mac Con Iomaire, Gaelic-Irish surname

Overview

In Ireland, the surname Montgomery has in some cases undergone gaelicisation, with Montgomery translated into Mac Con Iomaire. It is also used to translate the surname Ridge. It is found mainly in Gaeltacht areas such as County Donegal and County Galway, but also in urban areas such as Dublin.

It is quite distinct from the very similar surname Mac an Iomaire.

Bearers of the name
 Colm Mac Con Iomaire, musician with Irish band The Frames
 Darach Mac Con Iomaire, actor and director
 Liam Mac Con Iomaire, biographer, journalist and broadcaster
 Mairtin Mac Con Iomaire, professional chef
 Nuala Nic Con Iomaire, playwright, died 2010
 Pádraic Mac Con Iomaire, seanchai
 Rónán Mac Con Iomaire, journalist and Deputy Head RnaG 
 Tomás Mac Con Iomaire, radio producer

External links
 http://www.irishtimes.com/ancestor/surname/index.cfm?fuseaction=Go.&UserID=

Surnames
Irish families
Surnames of Irish origin
Irish-language surnames
Families of Irish ancestry